The 2005 Chicago Marathon was the 28th running of the annual marathon race in Chicago, United States and was held on October 9. The elite men's race was won by Kenya's Felix Limo in a time of 2:07:02 hours and the women's race was won by home athlete Deena Kastor in 2:21:25.

Results

Men

Women

References

Results. Association of Road Racing Statisticians. Retrieved 2020-04-09.

External links 

 Official website

Chicago Marathon
Chicago
2000s in Chicago
2005 in Illinois
Chicago Marathon
Chicago Marathon